Shun Lee is an area north of Sau Mau Ping and east of Ngau Chi Wan in Hong Kong. The area was originally known as Rennie's Farm. It is later named after the first public housing estate in the area, Shun Lee Estate. It is also known as Sze Shun (四順, i.e. Four Shun) as there are four estates with name starting with Shun in 2006.

Before any urban development, the rural area belonged to the rural district of Ngau Chi Wan. Later, it was also once considered an extension of Ngau Tau Kok. After the establishment of District Boards of Hong Kong, the area is administratively under Kwun Tong District.

Geography
The area is a valley surrounded by hills. A main river flowed from Custom Hill and joined another river from Kowloon Peak and emptied into Kowloon Bay via Jordan Valley.

Public housing

The public housing estates and Home Ownership Scheme in Sze Shun includes Shun Lee Estate, Shun On Estate, Shun Chi Court and Shun Tin Estate.

Shun Lee Estate

Shun Lee Estate is the earliest public housing estate in Sze Shun area. It has totally 7 residential blocks built in 1978 and 1980 respectively.

Houses

Shun Lee Estate is in Primary One Admission (POA) School Net 46. Within the school net are multiple aided schools (operated independently but funded with government money); no government primary schools are in this net.

Shun On Estate

Shun On Estate has 3 residential blocks built in 1978.

Houses

Shun On Estate is in Primary One Admission (POA) School Net 46. Within the school net are multiple aided schools (operated independently but funded with government money); no government primary schools are in this net.

Shun Chi Court

Shun Chi Court is one of the first Home Ownership Scheme estates in Hong Kong. It consists of 6 residential blocks built in 1980.

Houses

Shun Chi Court is in Primary One Admission (POA) School Net 46. Within the school net are multiple aided schools (operated independently but funded with government money); no government primary schools are in this net.

Shun Tin Estate

Shun Tin Estate has 11 residential blocks built in 1981, 1983 and 1989 respectively.

Houses

References

External links

 
Kwun Tong
Kwun Tong District
New Kowloon